The President's Commission on the United States Postal Service was a Presidential Commission formed by United States President George W. Bush on December 11, 2002, through .

References

United States Postal Service, President's Commission on the
United States Postal Service
Presidency of George W. Bush